Piz Terza (also known as Urtirolaspitz) is a mountain in the Sesvenna Range of the Alps, located on the border between Italy and Switzerland.

The closest locality is Müstair.

References

External links
 Piz Terza on Hikr

Mountains of the Alps
Mountains of Graubünden
Mountains of South Tyrol
Italy–Switzerland border
International mountains of Europe
Mountains of Switzerland
Two-thousanders of Switzerland
Val Müstair